"Ain't Necessarily So" is a song written by Beth Nielsen Chapman, and recorded by American country music artist Willie Nelson.  It was released in September 1990 as the first single from his album Born for Trouble.  The song reached number 17 on the Billboard Hot Country Singles & Tracks chart.

Chart performance

References

1990 singles
Willie Nelson songs
Columbia Records singles
Songs written by Beth Nielsen Chapman
1990 songs
Song recordings produced by Fred Foster